The second season of Gilmore Girls, an American dramedy television series, began airing on October 9, 2001 on The WB. The season concluded on May 21, 2002, after 22 episodes. The series was moved from Thursday nights to Tuesday at 8/7c (taking over Buffy the Vampire Slayers old timeslot after UPN picked it up from The WB), where it aired for the entire season.

On January 15, 2002, The WB announced that the show was renewed for a third season.

Overview
The season opens with Lorelai accepting Max's proposal. However, she calls off the wedding a few days beforehand, realising she doesn't truly love him. Christopher returns with a new girlfriend, Sherry, who he seems ready to settle down with. Both Lorelai and Emily are disappointed that he wasn't ready to settle down with Lorelai, but they remain in friendly contact.

Rory spends the season in a relationship with Dean, while Tristin, the main rival for her affections from the first season, is sent away to military school. Luke's nephew Jess comes to stay with him after getting into trouble at home in New York and his interest in Rory is plain. Jess and Rory are involved in a car accident that destroys the car Dean refurbished for Rory and leaves Rory with a fractured wrist. Despite Rory's protests, the whole town blames Jess, who goes back to New York. The incident causes a rift between Lorelai and Luke.

Richard feels he is being pushed out at work so resigns. He struggles with retirement and eventually opens his own insurance consultancy business. Lane joins the cheerleaders, attempts a romance with Henry and decides she wants to become a drummer. Paris becomes editor of the school newspaper giving her another reason to order Rory about, but slowly they realise they have become friends. Sookie and Jackson become engaged while Michel has a visit from his mother.

In the season finale, Paris and Rory are elected as class president and vice-president, meaning they will have to spend the summer in Washington. Lorelai sleeps with Christopher but their attempt at being a family falters when he hears Sherry is pregnant and goes back to her. Jess returns to town and Rory kisses him even though she is still dating Dean. The season closes with a stricken Lorelai and Rory walking down the aisle as Sookie's bridesmaids.

Cast

Main cast
 Lauren Graham as Lorelai Gilmore, Rory's mother.
 Alexis Bledel as Rory Gilmore, Lorelai's daughter.
 Melissa McCarthy as Sookie St. James, Lorelai's best friend and co-worker.
 Keiko Agena as Lane Kim, Rory's best friend.
 Yanic Truesdale as Michel Gerard, Lorelai and Sookie's co-worker.
 Scott Patterson as Luke Danes, the owner of the local diner.
 Liza Weil as Paris Geller, Rory's classmate and frenemy.
 Jared Padalecki as Dean Forester, Rory's boyfriend.
 Milo Ventimiglia as Jess Mariano, Luke's nephew and Dean's rival.
 Kelly Bishop as Emily Gilmore, Lorelai's mother and Rory's grandmother.
 Edward Herrmann as Richard Gilmore, Lorelai's father and Rory's grandfather.

Guest
 Chad Michael Murray as Tristin Dugray, Rory's classmate and admirer.
 Scout Taylor Compton as Clara Forester, Dean's younger sister.

Recurring cast
 Sean Gunn as Kirk Gleason, a resident of Stars Hollow that works many jobs.
 Liz Torres as Miss Patty, the owner of the local dance studio.
 Michael Winters as Taylor Doose, the owner of the local grocery store.
 Jackson Douglas as Jackson Belleville, Sookie's fiance.
 Teal Redmann as Louise Grant, Paris's best friend.
 Shelly Cole as Madeline Lynn, Paris's best friend.
 David Sutcliffe as Christopher Hayden, Rory's father and Lorelai's ex-boyfriend.
 Sally Struthers as Babette Dell, Rory and Lorelai's nextdoor neighbor.
 Emily Kuroda as Mrs. Kim, Lane's religious mother.
 Brian Tarantina as Bootsy, a resident of Stars Hollow.
 Scott Cohen as Max Medina, Lorelai's ex-fiance.
 Grant Lee Phillips as Grant, the town troubadour.
 Mike Gandolfi as Andrew, the owner of the local bookstore.
 Ted Rooney as Morey Dell, Babette's husband and Lorelai and Rory's next door neighbor.
 Adam Wylie as Brad Langford, Rory's classmate.
 Rose Abdoo as Gypsy, the owner of the local auto shop.
 Dakin Matthews as Headmaster Hanlin Charleston, the principal of Chilton.
 Biff Yeager as Tom, a resident of Stars Hollow.
 Mädchen Amick as Sherry Tinsdale, Christopher's girlfriend.
 Emily Bergl as Francie Jarvisss, Rory's classmate.

 Cast Notes

Episodes

DVD release

References

Season
2001 American television seasons
2002 American television seasons